NA-175 may refer to:

NA-175 (Rahim Yar Khan-I), a constituency of the National Assembly of Pakistan
NA-175 (Rajanur-II), a former constituency of the National Assembly of Pakistan